Dassanayake or Dassanaike is a Sinhalese surname.

Notable people
 Ananda Dassanayake (1920–2012), Sri Lankan politician
 Chamara Sampath Dassanayake, Sri Lankan politician
 D. M. Dassanayake (1953–2008), Sri Lankan politician
 Dharmasiri Dassanayake, Sri Lankan politician
 Duminda Dassanayake (born 1988), Sri Lankan cricketer
 Gehan Dassanayake, Sri Lankan cricketer
 Indra Dassanayake (1943–2019), Sri Lankan academic
 Ivan Dassanayake (born 1910), Ceylonese politician
 Kingsley C. Dassanaike (born 1914), Ceylonese scout leader
 Pubudu Dassanayake (born 1970), Sri Lankan cricketer
 Sarath Dassanayake (1942–1999), Sri Lankan composer
 Sarinda Dassanayake (born 1995), Sri Lankan cricketer
 Tudor Dassanayake (died 2006), Sri Lankan civil servant

See also
 
 

Sinhalese surnames